Lee Kenny Odenwalder is an Australian politician. He has been a Labor member of the South Australian House of Assembly since the 2010 election, representing Little Para until 2018 and Elizabeth thereafter. Odenwalder has been linked with the Shop, Distributive and Allied Employees Association (SDA).

Odenwalder was born in London, England, and moved to Australia with his parents in 1981. He attended Fremont High School in Elizabeth Park (now merged into the larger Playford International College) and has an Honours degree in History from the University of Adelaide. He managed a video store, then joined the South Australia Police and was based at Elizabeth.

References

 

Members of the South Australian House of Assembly
Living people
21st-century Australian politicians
Year of birth missing (living people)
Australian Labor Party members of the Parliament of South Australia
University of Adelaide alumni
Politicians from London

Australian trade unionists